The Sherwood Conferences were a series of classified conferences that were held between 1952 and 1958 in the United States. These conferences were a part of the United States controlled nuclear program called Project Sherwood. These conferences were established in order to entice experienced personnel to join the newly developed Project Sherwood. There were three  different plasma confinement designs that were being researched in three different locations: the stellarator at Princeton Plasma Physics Laboratory, the torodial pinch at Los Alamos National Laboratory, and the magnetic mirror at the Livermore National Laboratory. Because these individual projects operated in separate facilities, these conferences were helpful to strengthen communication of information between all three projects.

The First Conference
The first Sherwood conference was organized by the AEC director of the Division of Research, Thomas Johnson. The conference was held at the University of Denver in Denver, Colorado on June 28, 1952. To attract more experienced personnel, workers already participating on the projects attended the conference. Overall, there were about eighty scientists that attended the first conference.

Dates and Locations of the Sherwood Conferences

References

See also
 Project Sherwood
 Timeline of nuclear fusion

Nuclear history of the United States